Asad Kasumovic (born 28 August 2001), is an Australian professional footballer who plays as a forward for Adelaide United.

References

External links

2001 births
Living people
Australian soccer players
Association football forwards
West Adelaide SC players
Adelaide City FC players
Adelaide United FC players
National Premier Leagues players
A-League Men players